The inferior medullary velum (posterior medullary velum) is a thin layer of white substance, prolonged from the white center of the cerebellum, above and on either side of the nodule; it forms the infero-posterior part of the fourth ventricle.

Somewhat semilunar in shape, its convex edge is continuous with the white substance of the cerebellum, while its thin concave margin is apparently free; in reality, however, it is continuous with the epithelium of the ventricle, which is prolonged downward from the posterior medullary velum to the taeniae.

See also
 Superior medullary velum

References

Neuroanatomy